Karl I of Hohenzollern (1516 in Brussels – 18 March 1576 at Sigmaringen Castle) was Count of Hohenzollern from 1525 to 1575.  He was Imperial Archchamberlain and chairman of the Aulic Council.

Life 
Karl was the eldest son of the Count Eitel Friedrich III of Hohenzollern (1494–1525) from his marriage to Johanna van Witthem (d. 1544), daughter of Philip, Lord of Beersel and Boutersem. Karl was Imperial Archchamberlain and later chairman of the Aulic Council.  In 1534, he received the Counties of Sigmaringen and Veringen as imperial fiefs from Emperor Karl V.

Karl married in 1537 with Anna (1512–1579), a daughter of Margrave Ernst of Baden-Durlach, with whom he had several children, among them:
 Ferfried (1538–1556),
 Marie (1544–1611),
 Eitel Friedrich IV (1545–1605), later the first Count of Hohenzollern-Hechingen
 Karl II (1547–1606), later the first Count of Hohenzollern-Sigmaringen
 Johanna (1548–1604),
 Jacobea Marie (1549–1578) wife of Leonard V of Harrach (1542–1597),
 Eleanor (1551–1598),
 Christoph (1552–1592), later the first Count of Hohenzollern-Haigerloch
 Magdalena (1553–1571), a nun in Holz,
 Joachim (1554–1587), titular Count of Hohenzollern
 Kunigunde (1558–1595), a nun at Inzigkofen Abbey

He had held the family possessions in a single hand since the Counts of Haigerloch had died out with the death of his cousin Jobst Nicholas II in 1558.  After his death in 1576, however, they were divided.  His eldest son, Eitel Friedrich IV became the founder of the Hohenzollern-Hechingen line.  His second son, Karl II, founded the Hohenzollern-Sigmaringen.  The third son, Christoph, founded the Hohenzollern-Haigerloch line, which died out in 1634, with Christoph's share falling to Hohenzollern-Sigmaringen.  The youngest son, Joachim, received the county of Zollern.  This line was the first to die out, when Joachim's son Joachim Georg died in 1602.

Ancestry

External links 
 Hohenzollern family tree on the site of the Hohenzollern family business

Counts of Hohenzollern
House of Hohenzollern
1516 births
1576 deaths
16th-century German people